Assam Pradesh Congress Committee (or Assam PCC) was formed in June 1921. Its headquarters is at Rajiv Bhavan in GS Road Guwahati.

Kuladhar Chaliha was the first elected president and Chabilal Upadhyaya was the first selected president of the committee when it was founded.

Bhupen Kumar Borah is appointed as the new president on 24 July 2021 replacing Ripun Bora.

Assam Legislative Assembly election

List of Presidents

Structure and Composition

See also

 All India Congress Committee
 Congress Working Committee
 Indian National Congress
 Pradesh Congress Committee
 Chabilal Upadhyaya
 Kuladhar Chaliha

References

External links
 
 Nurul Islam - Secretary of Assam Pradesh Congress Committee

Politics of Assam
Indian National Congress by state or union territory
Political parties established in 1921